Jeffery Hart Bent, occasionally known as Geoffrey Hart Bent (1781 – 29 June 1852) was the first judge in the colony of New South Wales and the first Australian judge to be removed from office.

Early life
Bent was the son of the merchant, ship owner, and MP Robert Bent, of West Molesey, Surrey, and of Portugal Street, Lincoln's Inn Fields, and elder brother of Ellis Bent. He was educated at Mr Barnes's school, Manchester, and at Trinity College, Cambridge, graduating B.A. in 1804, and M.A. in 1807. He was called to the bar of the Middle Temple in 1806.

New South Wales
He was appointed judge of the Supreme Court of Civil Judicature of New South Wales, arriving at Sydney on 28 July 1814. He refused to disembark until acknowledged with a formal salute. He had been only a few weeks in the colony before he was appealing to Earl Bathurst against a decision of Governor Macquarie to fit up one of the wings of the hospital as a temporary court house. There was much delay in holding the first sitting of the court, which was eventually fixed for 1 May 1815, and even then there were repeated adjournments because Bent refused to allow anyone who had been transported to be allowed to practice as an attorney. Macquarie was anxious that all convicts who had expiated their crime should be given every opportunity to rehabilitate themselves and lead normal lives as members of the community. Some of the men objected to by Bent had hitherto been permitted to plead before his brother, Ellis Bent, the judge-advocate, and Macquarie was satisfied that no evil consequences had resulted. He pointed out, too, that under the new regulations there would be only one attorney in the colony who would be able to plead, and that therefore one party only in each suit could have legal assistance in bringing his case forward. The tone of Bent's communications to the governor showed a great want of respect, and on 1 July 1815 Macquarie wrote to Earl Bathurst about the Bent brothers, stating that it had now become "absolutely necessary for the good of the colony . . . that they or I should be removed from it". Both of the brothers were recalled and Jeffery Bent left for England in 1817.

Late life
Bent was appointed Chief Justice of Grenada from 1820–1833 (where he was twice suspended), of St Lucia, 1833–1836, and of British Guiana from 1836 where he died (in Georgetown), on 29 June 1852. 

Bent was difficult and autocratic. His opinions on the employment of ex-convicts in courts are to some extent understandable, but he made no allowance for the differing views of Governor Macquarie and his difficulties.

Commentary on Bent
Murray Gleeson, Chief Justice of Australia described Bent as follows:

He is generally regarded, not only as the first judge in New South Wales, but also as the worst. The one thing he had to recommend him was a spirit of independence. He gave an early display of his mettle upon his arrival in Sydney, by refusing to disembark from his ship until the Governor arranged for a proper battery of guns to salute him. He refused to pay the road toll levied on users of Sydney's main road. He said he would be damned if he would pay any illegal tax. He called the gatekeeper a scoundrel, and threatened to put him in gaol. As a result, he was charged with toll evasion, convicted by a magistrate and fined two pounds. There being no Judicial Commission in those days, the matter was left to rest there.
The Court presided over by Judge Bent only ever sat to hear one item of civil business. That was an application by three ex-convict attorneys for admission to practice. The judge, who was at risk of being outvoted by the two magistrates with whom he sat, peremptorily announced that the application was refused, and that he would never preside in a court where ex-convicts were admitted to practice. Soon afterwards he was recalled to England.

References

1781 births
1852 deaths
19th-century English judges
Chief Justices of British Guiana
Colony of New South Wales judges
Chief justices of Grenada
Alumni of Trinity College, Cambridge
Members of the Middle Temple
19th-century Australian judges